Patiala Airport (Patiala Aviation Complex) is a civil aerodrome located in Patiala, Punjab in India. Patiala Air Club is based here and it has a fleet of 4 Cessna 172, 2 FA152, 1 Beech 58 and operated 1 Technam P2006T.

References 

Transport in Patiala
Airports in Punjab, India
Airports with year of establishment missing